Northern New Mexico in cultural terms usually refers to the area of heavy-Spanish settlement in the north-central part of New Mexico. However, New Mexico state government also uses the term to mean the northwest and north central, but to exclude both the northeastern high plains counties and Sandoval County. The five largest cities in Northern New Mexico are: Santa Fe, Las Vegas, Española, Los Alamos, and Raton.

Cultural

The traditional southern boundary of the area is an escarpment called La Bajada southwest of Santa Fe. The other boundaries are poorly defined. The area might also be described roughly as comprising Rio Arriba, Los Alamos, Taos, and Colfax Counties; northeastern Sandoval County, northern Santa Fe County; and western San Miguel and Mora Counties, possibly with parts of adjoining counties. To the west is the Four Corners region; to the east are the high plains of Eastern New Mexico.

Governmental

New Mexico state government generally divides New Mexico into four regions: Eastern, Central, Southwestern and Northern New Mexico. For those purposes Northern includes the Four Corners area together with the cultural area, but excludes Sandoval County. The Northwest Region is frequently referred to as the "Four-Corners Region".

Tourism
For tourists, New Mexico is divided into six regions, with Northern New Mexico being divided into North Central Region, Northeast Region and Northwest Region. Sandoval County is part of the Central Region to the south. Under that schema, the North Central Region includes the core part of cultural Northern New Mexico.

Northern Rio Grande National Heritage Area
The Northern Rio Grande National Heritage Area is in the Upper Rio Grande Valley and North Central Region of northern New Mexico. It is a federally designated National Heritage Area. It includes the area that has been inhabited by the Puebloan peoples since the early Pre-Columbian era.

Notable people
 

Andrew Valdez (born 1951), juvenile court judge for Salt Lake County, Utah.

Notes

See also
New Mexico
List of census-designated places in New Mexico
List of counties in New Mexico
List of municipalities in New Mexico
New Mexico statistical areas

References
  The second edition doesn't include the map.

External links

Regions of New Mexico
Spanish-American culture in New Mexico
Geography of Cibola County, New Mexico
Geography of Colfax County, New Mexico
Geography of Mora County, New Mexico
Geography of Los Alamos County, New Mexico
Geography of McKinley County, New Mexico
Geography of Rio Arriba County, New Mexico
Geography of San Juan County, New Mexico
Geography of San Miguel County, New Mexico
Geography of Santa Fe County, New Mexico
Geography of Taos County, New Mexico
Northern Rio Grande National Heritage Area